Riverside station is a historic railroad station located at Riparius, Warren County, New York.  It was built in 1913 and is a one-story, rectangular (40 feet by 168 feet), hipped roof frame building with covered platforms at each end.  A baggage room was added between 1915 and 1924.  It was built by the Delaware and Hudson Railroad and embodies a Prairie School style design. It was also operated as a station for the Upper Hudson River Railroad scenic railway.

It was added to the National Register of Historic Places in 1997 as the Riverside Train Station.

References

External links
Upper Hudson River Railroad website

Railway stations on the National Register of Historic Places in New York (state)
Prairie School architecture in New York (state)
Railway stations in the United States opened in 1913
Transportation buildings and structures in Warren County, New York
Former Delaware and Hudson Railway stations
1913 establishments in New York (state)
National Register of Historic Places in Warren County, New York